

Wind Energy Associations Members Directory
Some wind industry associations, such as the Global Wind Energy Council, the World Wind Energy Association, and WindEurope, provide publicly available membership directories on their websites. Other wind industry associations, such as the Canadian Wind Energy Association and the American Wind Energy Association, have membership directories only available to members.

Wind Energy Site Assessment Consultants  
Wind Measurements, Site Assessments, Anemometer Calibration, Remote Wind Sensing, Wind Measurement System Sales
Arup
Bureau Veritas
TUV SUD
COWI A/S
DNV
Fichtner
Lloyd's Register
Mott MacDonald
Parsons Brinckerhoff
Ramboll
Western Electricity Coordinating Council
Wood Group
WSP Global
Tractebel Engineering

Wind Turbines: Power Performance Testing Consultants 
Power Curve Measurements, Vibration Analysis, Measurement of Rotor Blade Angles, Rotor Imbalance Testing
DNV GL
COWI A/S
Fichtner
Hatch Ltd
Intertek
National Wind Institute (NWI)
Ramboll
TUV SUD
Wood Group
WSP Global

Wind Turbines: Design and Certification  
Technischer Überwachungsverein (TÜV)
Bureau Veritas
DNV GL
Lloyd's Register

Industry Analysts  
Arup
BTM Consult
COWI A/S
DNV GL
Intertek
Lloyd's Register
Multiconsult
Ramboll
Bureau Veritas

Consultants Acting as Owner's Engineer for Wind Farm Projects  
Arup
Black & Veatch
Bureau Veritas
Burns & McDonnell
COWI A/S
DNV GL
Grontmij A/S
Mott MacDonald
Multiconsult
Parsons Brinckerhoff
Ramboll
Tractebel Engineering
TUV SUD
Wood Group
WSP Global

Wind power